Pushkin Press is a British-based publishing house dedicated to publishing novels, essays, memoirs and children's books. The London-based company was founded in 1997 and is notable for publishing authors such as Stefan Zweig, Marcel Aymé, Antal Szerb, Paul Morand and Yasushi Inoue, as well as award-winning contemporary writers, including Andrés Neuman, Edith Pearlman, Ayelet Gundar-Goshen, Eka Kurniawan and Ryu Murakami.

History 
Pushkin Press was founded in 1997 by Melissa Ulfane whose ambition was to bring literature in translation to the UK. Pushkin Press is notable for rediscovering less known European classics of the twentieth century and is largely responsible for reigniting worldwide interest into authors such as Stefan Zweig and Antal Szerb.

In 2012, Pushkin Press was bought by Adam Freudenheim, then Penguin Classics publisher, and Stephanie Seegmuller, a former Penguin senior business development manager.  Seegmuller left Pushkin in March 2015.

In 2013, Pushkin Press created Pushkin Children's Books, an imprint dedicated to publishing tales for younger readers. In its first year, Pushkin Children's Books published English translations of the French children's series Oksa Pollock by Anne Plichota and Cendrine Wolf, the first of which, The Last Hope, was the company's bestselling title in 2014.  Dutch Classic The Letter for the King by Tonke Dragt, translated into English by Laura Watkinson, has been the company's most successful children's book.

Also in Autumn 2013, Pushkin Press created ONE, an imprint focused on literary debuts that publishes one exceptional fiction or non-fiction title a season. All titles published under the ONE imprint were initially commissioned and edited by Elena Lappin.  Lappin left Pushkin in 2017, but the ONE imprint continues with the focus on contemporary English-language originals.

Pushkin Press is also known for its beautifully produced and designed books, many of which often feature thickly grained covers and French flaps.

ONE 
Titles published by ONE so far include the Man Booker Prize shortlisted
Chigozie Obioma – The Fishermen (26 February 2015)

Key people 
 Publisher & Managing Director: Adam Freudenheim
 Deputy Publisher: Laura Macaulay
 Editor: Daniel Seton
 Publicist: Tabitha Pelly
 Editor: Harriet Wade
 Head of Marketing: Natalie Ramm
 Digital Marketing Executive: Elise Jackson
 Editorial Assistant: Rory Williamson
 Managing Editor: India Darsley
 Children's Editor-at-Large: Sarah Odedina
 Children's Editor: Simon Mason

References

External links
  
 Pushkin Children’s Books (imprint subsite)
 ONE (imprint subsite)

Publishing companies established in 1997
Book publishing companies based in London